Rhiannon Afua "Rhian" Benson (born 10 January 1977 in Accra, Ghana) is a Ghanaian-British soul and jazz singer and songwriter.

Early life
Benson was born in Accra, Ghana, to a Welsh mother, who was a singer, and an Ashanti father, who was a guitarist, and she has a younger sister and a brother. She was raised in Ghana, India (where her family moved following a diplomatic posting of her father), and her mother's native United Kingdom, where she eventually settled. Benson began playing piano and guitar and writing songs and poetry at an early age.
Before pursuing a career in music, she attended the London School of Economics and gained a degree in econometrics. She continued her education studying Economics through Harvard's extension certificate program, which she did not complete due to the illness of her mother. Benson later worked at an investment bank.

Career
Once back in the UK, she performed in small London clubs and was discovered by the Los Angeles-based record label, DKG Music. Benson moved to Los Angeles, California to record her debut album, Gold Coast, which was released in October 2003. She wrote all the songs on the album, having composed the music on guitar and keyboards, and co-produced it with producers Bob Power and James Poyser.

Benson won a Mobo Award in 2005.

With the help of Denmark's production duo, Jonas Rendbo and Daniel Fridell, Benson released her second album, Hands Clean, on 14 February 2011. The album redefined modern soul as Benson sang with soulful electronic backing. The confessional tales of love, loss and life represented a bold, new direction for her. "Better Without You" was the first single to be released in February 2011.

Discography

Albums
 2003: Gold Coast
 2011: Hands Clean

Singles
 2003: "Say How I Feel" – UK No. 27
 2003: "Stealing My Piece Of Mind"
 2011: "Better Without You"

References

External links

Alumni of the London School of Economics
Harvard Extension School alumni
Musicians from Accra
Ghanaian jazz musicians
Neo soul singers
Ghanaian people of Welsh descent
English people of Ashanti descent
English people of Welsh descent
Ghanaian expatriates in England
Living people
English soul singers
British contemporary R&B singers
English contraltos
21st-century Black British women singers
1977 births
Ballad musicians